The Battle of Raichur was a battle fought between the Vijayanagara Empire and the Sultanate of Bijapur in 1520 in the town of Raichur, India. It resulted in a decisive victory for Vijayanagara forces, and the Bijapur ruler was defeated and pushed across the river Krishna.

Background 
The fort of Raichur was built by Kakatiya king Rudra in 1284, and passed on to the Vijayanagara Kingdom after the decline of Kakatiyas. Ever since, the fort had been under dispute for nearly two centuries. The fort, along with other areas of the northern Deccan, was captured by Muhammad Bin Tughluq in 1323.The Bahmani Sultanate captured the fort in 1347. Saluva Narasimha Deva Raya attempted to recapture the city of Raichur from the Bahmanis, but failed.The immediate prelude to the Battle of Raichur began in the year 1520. In that year, Krishnadevaraya sent Seyed Maraikar, a Muslim in his service, to Goa with a large sum of money to buy horses. Maraikar betrayed Krishnadevaraya's cause and went to Adil Khan with the money and offered his services. Krishnadevaraya made a demand that Maraikar be returned along with the money which was duly refused. During the period of peace Krishnadevaraya made extensive preparations for a grand attack on Raichur Doab. After the court decided that Raichur should be attacked, the king invited Military Commander Pemmasani Ramalinga Nayudu (Nayakas) in his service to take part in the battle.

Battle
The battle was fought in Raichur between the armies of Krishnadevaraya and the Sultanate of Bijapur. Main commander of the Vijayanagara army was Saluva Timmarusu also known as Saluva Timma. The Vijayanagara Empire had a force consisting of 32,600 cavalry and 551 elephants according to contemporary sources. The Bijapur Sultanate had a force consisting of 7,000 cavalry and 250 elephants. Modern and contemporary writers disagree on the number of infantry personnel that each side had. The contemporary sources say that Krishnadevaraya had an infantry force consisting of a bit over 700,000 soldiers. Moreover, the use of a Portuguese contingent commanded by Cristovão de Figueiredo with the use of fireweapons help to conquer the fortress, there is a high probability that matchlocks, which were obtained through contact with the Portuguese, were used as well by the army of the Vijayanagara Empire. Additionally the Portuguese with their arquebuses picked off the defenders from the walls, and thus enabled the besiegers to approach close to the lines of fortification and pull down the stones. Driven to desperation, and their governor being slain, the garrison surrendered. Portuguese accounts state that cannons were used extensively by the Bijapur Sultanate; the Vijayanagara Empire used them minimally, at best.  The Vijayanagara Empire emerged victorious despite the Bijapur Sultanate having superior firepower.

Aftermath 
When the city of Raichur surrendered, Krishnadevaraya made a triumphal entry into it. Krishnadevaraya was brutal towards Bahmani Generals of Raichur. Many Bahmani generals lost their lands. The other Muslim kings sent envoys to the emperor on hearing of his success and received a haughty reply.. The king conveyed that if Adil Shah would come to him, do obeisance, and kiss his foot, his lands would be restored to him. The submission never took place. Krishnadevaraya then led his army as far north as Bijapur and occupied it. He took prisoner three sons of a former king of the Bahmani dynasty, who had been held captive by the Adil Shah and he proclaimed the eldest as king of the Deccan. This attempt to subvert the rule of the five Sultans who had established themselves on the ruins of the single Deccan sovereignty only resulted in stiffening their hostility towards their common foe. Krishnadevaraya began to make preparations for an attack on Belgaum, which was in Adil Shah's possession. Soon after, he fell seriously ill to carry out his project and died at the age of forty-five years, in the year 1530. He was succeeded by Achyuta Deva Raya.

Political consequences
The battle of Raichur had far-reaching effects. The Vijayanagara victory weakened the power and prestige of the Adil Shah. He turned his attention to making alliances with the other Muslim neighbours. The victory also caused other Sultans in Deccan to form an alliance to defeat the Vijayanagara Empire. The war also affected the fortunes of the Portuguese on the west coast. Goa rose and fell simultaneously with the rise and fall of the Vijayanagara dynasty because their entire trade depended on Hindu support.

References

Bibliography

Further reading
 
 Krishnaraja Vijayam - Kumara Dhurjati (in Telugu).
 Sougandhika Prasavapaharanamu - Ratnakaram Gopala Kavi (in Telugu).
 K. Iswara Dutt, Journal of Andhra Historical Research Society. Vol. 10, pp. 222–224.
 K. A. Nilakanta Sastry, Further Sources of Vijayanagara History - 1946(https://archive.org/details/FurtherSourcesOfVijayanagaraHistory)

Battles involving the Vijayanagara Empire
Islamic rule in the Indian subcontinent
History of Karnataka
History of Andhra Pradesh
1520 in India
Conflicts in 1520
Raichur district